Love at the Greek is a live double album by Neil Diamond which was released in 1977. It was Diamond's second live album recorded from a concert at The Greek Theater in Los Angeles, and Neil's second album produced by Robbie Robertson of The Band (the first being 1976's Beautiful Noise). The CD release does not include the songs "The Last Picasso" and "Longfellow Serenade".

This album was released in conjunction with a television special broadcast of the concert footage that aired in the United States on February 21, 1977. The television special, broadcast on NBC (and simulcast on FM stations nationwide) was also titled "Love At The Greek." The special was nominated for four Emmy Awards. This 1977 television special was also later released as a VHS Video Tape.

Track listing

LP release

Side A 
 "Streetlife" – 2:00
 "Kentucky Woman" – 1:57
 "Sweet Caroline" – 3:59
 "The Last Picasso" – 4:29
 "Longfellow Serenade" – 4:14

Side B 
 "Beautiful Noise" – 3:11
 "Lady Oh" – 4:04
 "Stargazer" – 2:37
 "If You Know What I Mean" – 4:11
 "Surviving the Life" – 4:49

Side C 
 "Glory Road" – 3:37
 "Song Sung Blue" – 4:09
 "Holly Holy" – 4:38
 "Brother Love's Travelling Salvation Show" – 5:31

Side D 
 "Jonathan Livingston Seagull" – 15:43
 "Be"
 "Dear Father"
 "Lonely Looking Sky"
 "Sanctus"
 "Skybird"
 "Be (Encore)"
 "I've Been This Way Before" – 4:56

CD release 
 "Introduction" – 1:41
 "Street Life" – 2:00
 "Kentucky Woman" – 1:57
 "Sweet Caroline" – 3:59
 "Beautiful Noise" – 3:11
 "Lady Oh" – 4:04
 "Stargazer" – 2:37
 "If You Know What I Mean" – 4:11
 "Surviving the Life" – 4:49
 "Glory Road" – 3:37
 "Song Sung Blue" – 4:09
 "Holly Holy" – 4:38
 "Brother Love's Travelling Salvation Show" – 5:31
 "Jonathan Livingston Seagull" – 15:43
 "Be"
 "Dear Father"
 "Lonely Looking Sky"
 "Sanctus"
 "Skybird"
 "Be (Encore)"
 "I've Been This Way Before" – 4:56

Personnel
 Reinie Press – bass guitar
 Dennis St. John – drums
 Doug Rhone – guitar
 Richard Bennett – guitar 
 Alan Lindgren – keyboards
 Tom Hensley – keyboards
 King Errison – percussion 
 Linda Press – vocals
 Neil Diamond – vocals, guitar

Charts

Weekly charts

Year-end charts

Certifications

References 

Neil Diamond live albums
1977 live albums
Columbia Records live albums
Albums recorded at the Greek Theatre (Los Angeles)
Albums produced by Robbie Robertson